The 1998 Wirral Metropolitan Borough Council election took place on 7 May 1998 to elect members of Wirral Metropolitan Borough Council in England. This election was held on the same day as other local elections.

After the election, the composition of the council was:

Election results

Overall election result

Overall result compared with 1996.

Ward results

Bebington

Bidston

Birkenhead

Bromborough

Clatterbridge

Claughton

Eastham

Egerton

Heswall

Hoylake

Leasowe

Liscard

Moreton

New Brighton

Oxton

Prenton

Royden

Seacombe

Thurstaston

Tranmere

Upton

Wallasey

Changes between 1998 and 1999

Notes

• italics denote the sitting councillor • bold denotes the winning candidate

References

1998 English local elections
1998
1990s in Merseyside